The 2022 Slovenian local elections were held 20 November (1st) and 4 December (2nd round). Mayors of all 212 municipalities and members of municipal councils were elected.

Names entered are already automatically old-new mayors, continuing or starting their work in office, because they have no counter-candidates in the elections.

Elected mayors

City municipalities

Over 20,000 citizens 
Ordinary municipalities with more than 20,000 citizens

Smaller municiapalities 
The rest of all 192 ordinary municiapalities with less than 20,000 citizens

Elections in city municiapalities

Ljubljana

Maribor

Kranj

Koper

Celje

Novo mesto

Velenje

Nova Gorica

Krško

Ptuj

Murska Sobota

Slovenj Gradec

Statistics

General

Elected mayor candidates by parties / lists

Notes

References 

Local elections in Slovenia
2022 in Slovenia
November 2022 events in Europe
2022 elections in Slovenia